The 28 September 2008 Baghdad bombings were a series of bombings that occurred on 28 September 2008, killing a total of 32 and injuring 100. The first car bomb of the day was planted in a minibus and was detonated late in the afternoon in the Shurta neighbourhood of south Baghdad, killing 12. Shortly after, a car bomb detonated in a parking lot of a market in the nearby Hay al-Amil district killing one. Later in the evening, a third car bomb and a roadside bomb was detonated in the Karrada district killing 19 people dead and injuring 70.

See also
 List of terrorist incidents in 2008

References

2000s in Baghdad
2008 murders in Iraq
Car and truck bombings in Iraq
Mass murder in 2008
Baghdad 28 September
Terrorist incidents in Baghdad